Louis-Camille d'Olivier (1827–1870) was a French photographer.

The pose of d'Olivier's Nu Allonge, etude was used by Richard Hamilton in his last, unfinished work, based upon Balzac's Le Chef-d'œuvre inconnu, and first exhibited in three parts known as "Balzac a, b, and c" (2011-2012) in The National Gallery, October 2012.

References

External links 

 Louis-Camille d' Olivier, Composition avec nu, 1853-1856 
 Louis-Camille D'Olivier

1827 births
1870 deaths
19th-century French photographers